Skory (lit. "rapid" or "fast"; alternate spellings Skoryy, and Skoriy) can refer to a number of Soviet destroyers:

 , a  completed on 18 July 1941.
 , a  commissioned on 23 September 1972.

See also
 , the first destroyer class built for the Soviet Navy after World War II.

Soviet Navy ship names